Doganovci (Cyrillic: Догановци) is a village in the municipality of Donji Vakuf, Bosnia and Herzegovina.

Demographics 
According to the 2013 census, its population was 196, all Bosniaks.

References

Populated places in Donji Vakuf